Noctua (Latin for "little owl") is a genus of moths. They have dull, cryptic forewings and often very bright hindwings. These are hidden under the forewings when the moths rest, leading to their common name of yellow underwings. They are not particularly closely related to the "true" underwing moths (Catocala) though, apart from both being Noctuoidea (and in the traditional classification, Noctuidae). They are good fliers.

Species
 Noctua atlantica (Warren, 1905
 Noctua carvalhoi Pinker, 1983
 Noctua comes – lesser yellow underwing Hübner, [1813]
 Noctua fimbriata – broad-bordered yellow underwing Schreber, 1759
 Noctua interjecta – least yellow underwing Hübner, [1803]
 Noctua interposita Hübner, [1790]
 Noctua janthe – lesser broad-bordered yellow underwing Borkhausen, 1792
 Noctua janthina – lesser broad-bordered yellow underwing  Denis & Schiffermüller, 1775
 Noctua noacki Boursin, 1957
 Noctua orbona – lunar yellow underwing Hufnagel, 1766
 Noctua pronuba – large yellow underwing (Linnaeus, 1758)
 Noctua teixeirai Pinker, 1971
 Noctua tertia Mentzer, Moberg & Fibiger, 1991
 Noctua tirrenica Biebinger, Speidel & Hanigk, 1983
 Noctua undosa Leech, 1889
 Noctua warreni Lödl, 1987

Noctua comparison

References

 Noctua at Markku Savela's Lepidoptera and Some Other Life Forms

External links

 
Noctuinae
Taxa named by Carl Linnaeus